Robsart Hospital is a Victorian-style hospital located in the village of Robsart. The hospital opened in 1917 and soon closed in the late 1930s. Since its closure, the hospital has sat empty and neglected, being one of few surviving rural hospitals of its kind in Canada.

Notable people born at the hospital

 Eiliv Anderson, born in Robsart in 1934 was a corporate executive, with a degree from the executive program of Queen's University's School of Business.
 Archie Smiley, born here in 1917, the last mayor of Robsart.

References

External links 
 Ghost towns of Saskatchewan by Johnnie Bachusky

Hospital buildings completed in 1917
Reno No. 51, Saskatchewan
Hospitals in Saskatchewan
Defunct hospitals in Canada
Hospitals established in 1917